Taylor Allderdice High School is a public high school in the Squirrel Hill neighborhood of Pittsburgh, Pennsylvania, United States. It was established in 1927 and is part of the Pittsburgh Public Schools district. It was named for industrialist and Squirrel Hill resident Taylor Allderdice, who was a member of the city's first school board and president of National Tube Company, a subsidiary of U.S. Steel.

Awards and recognition 
Allderdice was designated a National Blue Ribbon School by the U.S. Department of Education in 1994, 1995, and 1996.

Notable alumni

In popular culture 
In 2012, rapper Wiz Khalifa released Taylor Allderdice, a mixtape named for his alma mater.

References

External links 

 

High schools in Pittsburgh
Public high schools in Pennsylvania
Magnet schools in Pennsylvania
Neoclassical architecture in Pennsylvania
Pittsburgh History & Landmarks Foundation Historic Landmarks
National Register of Historic Places in Pittsburgh
School buildings on the National Register of Historic Places in Pennsylvania
School buildings completed in 1927
Educational institutions established in 1927
1927 establishments in Pennsylvania